This is a list of seasons played by Hapoel Ramat Gan Football Club in Israeli and European football, from 1939–40 (when the club first competed in the league) to the most recent completed season. It details the club's achievements in major competitions, and the top scorers for each season. Top scorers in bold were also the top scorers in the Israeli league that season. Records of minor competitions such as the Lilian Cup are not included due to them being considered of less importance than the State Cup and the Toto Cup.

History
Hapoel Ramat Gan was established in 1927 and was first promoted to the top division ahead of the 1941–42 season. The club stayed at the top division until the end of the 1959–60 season. The club won the second division on 1962–63 and was promoted to back to the top division. The following season the club won the league championship. Since 1970 the club played mainly in the second division. In 2002–03 the club won the Israel State Cup, becoming the first club outside the top division to win the cup. The club won a second cup in 2012–13.

Seasons

Key

 P = Played
 W = Games won
 D = Games drawn
 L = Games lost
 F = Goals for
 A = Goals against
 Pts = Points
 Pos = Final position

 Leumit = Liga Leumit (National League)
 Artzit = Liga Artzit (Nationwide League)
 Premier = Liga Al (Premier League)
 Pal. League = Palestine League

 F = Final
 Group = Group stage
 QF = Quarter-finals
 QR1 = First Qualifying Round
 QR2 = Second Qualifying Round
 QR3 = Third Qualifying Round
 QR4 = Fourth Qualifying Round
 RInt = Intermediate Round

 R1 = Round 1
 R2 = Round 2
 R3 = Round 3
 R4 = Round 4
 R5 = Round 5
 R6 = Round 6
 SF = Semi-finals

Notes

References

Hapoel Ramat Gan F.C.
 
Hapoel Ramat Gan